Ayvacık District is a district of the Çanakkale Province of Turkey. Its seat is the town of Ayvacık. Its area is 880 km2, and its population is 34,103 (2021).

Composition
There are two municipalities in Ayvacık District:
 Ayvacık
 Küçükkuyu

There are 64 villages in Ayvacık District:

 Adatepe
 Ahmetçe
 Ahmetler
 Akçin
 Arıklı
 Babadere
 Babakale
 Bademli
 Baharlar
 Bahçedere
 Balabanlı
 Behram
 Bektaş
 Bilaller
 Budaklar
 Büyükhusun
 Çakmaklar
 Çaltı
 Çamkalabak
 Çamköy
 Cemaller
 Çınarpınar
 Demirci
 Dibekli
 Erecek
 Gülpınar
 Güzelköy
 Hüseyinfakı
 İlyasfakı
 Kayalar
 Keçikaya
 Kestanelik
 Kırca
 Kısacık
 Kocaköy
 Korubaşı
 Kösedere
 Koyunevi
 Kozlu
 Küçükçetmi
 Küçükhusun
 Kulfal
 Kuruoba
 Misvak
 Naldöken
 Nusratlı
 Paşaköy
 Pınardere
 Sapanca
 Şapköy
 Sazlı
 Söğütlü
 Süleymanköy
 Tabaklar
 Tamış
 Tartaşık
 Taşağıl
 Taşboğaz
 Tuzla
 Tuztaşı
 Uzunalan
 Yeniçam
 Yeşilyurt
 Yukarıköy

References

Districts of Çanakkale Province